Burtscher is a surname. Notable people with the surname include:

 Benedikt Burtscher ( 1700), the building master of the Huguenot church in Usingen, Germany
 Michael Burtscher (born 1985), Filipino-Swiss basketballer
 Roland Burtscher (born 1969), Austrian tennis player and coach
 Wolfgang Burtscher ( 2020–present), the current Director-General for Agriculture and Rural Development of the European Union